Jeremy Hutchinson may refer to:

Jeremy Hutchinson, Baron Hutchinson of Lullington (1915-2017), British life peer
Jeremy Hutchinson (politician) (born 1974), United States politician